The 2011 Toronto Argonauts season was the 54th season for the team in the Canadian Football League and their 139th season overall. The Argonauts were eliminated from playoff contention on October 10, 2011 and failed to make a second straight playoff appearance, finishing 4th place in the East Division with a 6–12 record.

Offseason

CFL draft
The 2011 CFL Draft took place on Sunday, May 8, 2011. After trading their first round pick to Winnipeg for Steven Jyles, the Argonauts went into draft day without that pick. However, thanks to a trade with the Roughriders, Toronto selected offensive lineman Tyler Holmes with the seventh overall pick, by only giving up a second and a fourth pick. Overall, the Argonauts had seven selections in the draft.

Preseason

Regular season

Season standings

Season schedule 
 Win
 Loss
 Tie

Roster

Coaching staff

Awards and records

Milestones

References 

2011 Toronto Argonauts season
Toronto Argonauts seasons
Toronto Argonauts Season, 2011
Toronto Argo